Abdul Aziz Abdul Ghani (4 July 1939 – 22 August 2011) was a Yemeni politician who served as Prime Minister of Yemen from 1994 to 1997, under President Ali Abdullah Saleh. Ghani was a member of the General People's Congress party.

Ghani also served as the second Vice President of Yemen Arab Republic in the 1980s, and as the Prime Minister of the Yemen Arab Republic twice.  His first term was from 1975 to 1980, and his second term was from 1983 to unification in 1990.

Abdul Ghani was the president of the Consultative Council (Shura Council) from 2001 until his death in 2011.

He received his BA degree in economics from Colorado College in the United States in 1962 and an MA in economics from the University of Colorado in 1964.

He died in Saudi Arabia on 22 August 2011 from injuries suffered in a June assassination attempt on President Ali Abdullah Saleh, a government official with Saleh in Riyadh said.

Ghani was the first senior political figure to die from the explosion in Saleh's palace mosque which forced the president and a number of his aides to seek medical treatment in Saudi Arabia.

References

1939 births
2011 deaths
20th-century Yemeni people
21st-century Yemeni people
General People's Congress (Yemen) politicians
Governors of the Central Bank of Yemen
People from Taiz Governorate
Prime Ministers of Yemen
Vice presidents of North Yemen
20th-century Yemeni politicians
20th-century prime ministers of Yemen
Chairmen of the Consultative Assembly of Yemen